Maker Marial Maker (born 1 July 1997) is a South Sudanese footballer who plays as a defender or midfielder for Dandenong Thunder.

Career

Maker started his career with Australian eighth division side Truganina Hornets. Before the 2016 season, he signed for South Melbourne in the Australian second tier. Before the 2018 season, Maker signed for Australian third tier club Melbourne Victory Youth. Before the 2019 season, he signed for Port Melbourne Sharks in the Australian second tier. 

Before the second half of 2020–21, he signed for Spanish fourth tier team Fuenlabrada Promesas. In 2021, Maker signed for Atmosfera in the Lithuanian second tier. Before the 2022 season, he signed for Australian second tier outfit Dandenong Thunder.

Personal life

He is the cousin of professional basketball players Matur Maker and Makur Maker, and the younger brother of professional basketball player Thon Maker.

References

External links

 

1997 births
Association football defenders
Association football midfielders
Dandenong Thunder SC players
Expatriate footballers in Lithuania
Expatriate footballers in Spain
I Lyga players
Living people
National Premier Leagues players
Port Melbourne SC players
South Melbourne FC players
South Sudanese expatriate footballers
South Sudanese footballers
South Sudan international footballers
Victorian Premier League players